Jane Margaret Byrne (née Burke; May 24, 1933November 14, 2014) was an American politician who was the first woman to be elected mayor of a major city in the United States. She served as the 50th Mayor of Chicago from April 16, 1979, until April 29, 1983. Byrne won the Chicago mayoral election on April 3, 1979, becoming the first female mayor of the city. Prior to her tenure as mayor, Byrne served as Chicago's commissioner of consumer sales from 1969 until 1977.

Early life and career
Byrne was born Jane Margaret Burke on May 24, 1933, at John B. Murphy Hospital in the Lake View neighborhood on the north side of Chicago, Illinois, to Katherine Marie Burke (née Nolan), a housewife, and William Patrick Burke, vice president of Inland Steel. Raised on the city's north side, Byrne graduated from Saint Scholastica High School and attended St. Mary of the Woods for her first year of college. Byrne later transferred to Barat College, where she graduated with a bachelor's degree in chemistry and biology in 1955. Byrne entered politics to volunteer in John F. Kennedy's campaign for president in 1960. During that campaign she first met then Chicago Mayor Richard J. Daley. After meeting Daley, he appointed her to several positions, beginning in 1964 with a job in a city anti-poverty program In June 1965, she was promoted and worked with the Chicago Committee of Urban Opportunity.

In 1968, Byrne was appointed head of the City of Chicago's consumer affairs department. She served as a delegate to the 1972 Democratic National Convention (DNC) and chairperson of the DNC resolutions committee in 1973. Byrne was appointed co-chairperson of the Cook County Democratic Central Committee by Daley, over the objection of a majority of Democratic leaders, in 1975. The committee ousted Byrne shortly after Daley's death in late 1976. Shortly thereafter, Byrne accused the newly appointed mayor Michael Bilandic of being unfair to citizens of the city by approving an increase in regulated taxi fares, which Byrne charged was the result of a "backroom deal". Byrne was then dimissed from her post of head of consumer affairs by Bilandic.

Mayor of Chicago (1979–1983)

1979 election

Months after her firing as head of the consumer affairs department, Byrne challenged Bilandic in the 1979 Democratic mayoral primary, the real contest in the heavily Democratic Chicago. Officially announcing her mayoral campaign in August 1977, Byrne partnered with Chicago journalist and political consultant Don Rose, who served as her campaign manager. At first, political observers believed her to have little chance of winning. A memorandum inside the Bilandic campaign said it should portray her as "a shrill, charging, vindictive person—and nothing makes a woman look worse". However, the Chicago Blizzard of 1979 in January paralyzed the city and caused Bilandic to be seen as an ineffective leader. Jesse Jackson endorsed Byrne. Many Republican voters voted in the Democratic primary to beat Bilandic. Infuriated voters in the North Side and Northwest Side retaliated against Bilandic for the Democratic Party's slating of only South Side candidates for the mayor, clerk, and treasurer (the outgoing city clerk, John C. Marcin, was from the Northwest Side). These four factors combined to give Byrne a 51% to 49% victory over Bilandic in the primary. Positioning herself as a reformer, Byrne then won the main election with 82.1% of the vote, still the largest margin in a Chicago mayoral election.

Tenure

Leadership and general politics

Byrne made inclusive moves as mayor, such as shepherding the hiring the city's first African-American and female school superintendent Ruth B. Love, and she was the first mayor to recognize the gay community. Byrne helped to make Chicago more welcoming to the gay community. She ended the police department's practice of raiding gay bars, and declared the city's first official "Gay Pride Parade Day" in 1981. However, during her tenure, Byrne drifted away from many of the progressive tenets she had campaigned on. Byrne began to collaborate with aldermen such as Edward M. Burke and Ed Vrdolyak, whom, during her 1979 campaign, she had denounced as an "evil cabal".

In 1982, she supported the Cook County Democratic Party's replacement of its chairman, County Board President George Dunne, with her city council ally, Alderman Edward Vrdolyak.

Byrne and the Cook County Democratic Party endorsed Senator Ted Kennedy for president in 1980, but incumbent President Jimmy Carter won the Illinois Democratic Primary and even carried Cook County and the city of Chicago. Byrne's endorsement was later considered detrimental because of her controversial tenure, and Kennedy's loss in the city was a key moment in the 1980 Democratic Party presidential primaries because of Chicago's role in delivering his brother John F. Kennedy the 1960 Democratic presidential nomination. When Byrne and Kennedy walked in the annual Saint Patrick's Day parade they were sometimes booed by hecklers.

Simultaneously, Byrne and the Cook County Democratic Party's candidate in the 1980 election for Cook County State's Attorney (chief local prosecutor), 14th Ward Alderman Edward M. Burke, lost in the Democratic primary to Richard M. Daley, and Daley then unseated GOP incumbent Bernard Carey in the general election.

The Chicago Sun Times reported that Byrne's enemies publicly mocked her as "that crazy broad" and "that skinny bitch" and worse.

Appointments and personnel
In her first year in office, significant instances of turnover in prominent city positions led critics to accuse Byrne of running a "revolving door administration".

While Byrne initially made inclusive moves in regards to appointments as mayor, such as shepherding the hiring of the city's first African-American and female school superintendent Ruth B. Love, she later pivoted away from this. Among the later steps that Byrne took that upset many of the progressives and Blacks that had supported her in her 1979 mayoral campaign was replacing Black members of the Chicago Board of Education and Chicago Housing Authority board with White members, some of whom even held stances that critics viewed as racist.

During the 1979 mayoral election, Byrne pledged to fire Superintendent of the Chicago Police Department James E. O'Grady, accusing him of having "politicized" the department. Days after her inauguration as mayor, O'Grady resigned. Later that year, she relieved interim superintendent Joseph DiLeonardi of command. She appointed Samuel Nolan interim superintendent in his place, Nolan was the first African American to serve as head of the Chicago Police Department. In January 1980, Richard J. Brzeczek took office as permanent superintendent, having been appointed by Byrne. On her last day in office, after the resignation of Brzeczek as superintdendent, Byrne appointed James E. O'Grady as interim superintendent. By this time, Byrne had rescinded her past criticisms of O'Grady.

In 1980, Byrne appointed William R. Blair as Chicago fire commissioner.

Arts
During her campaign for mayor, Byrne promised to provide strong support to the performing arts. Chicago Tribune art critic Richard Christiansen hailed Byrne for having made, "the arts and amusements of the city a most significant part of her" mayoral administration.

As mayor, she provided $200,000 to the Lyric Opera of Chicago for the express purposes of providing family-friendly entertainment. She provided a similar amount to the Auditorium Theatre for them to acquire a new lighting board.

As mayor, Byrne funded the construction of the Miró's Chicago sculpture by artist Joan Miró.

Byrne allowed films to use Chicago as a filming location, leading to such movies as The Blues Brothers to shoot in Chicago.

Cabrini–Green 
On March 26, 1981, Byrne decided to move into the crime-ridden Cabrini–Green Homes housing project on the near-north side of Chicago after 37 shootings resulting in 11 murders occurred during a three-month period from January to March 1981. In her 2004 memoir, Byrne reflected about decision to move into Cabrini–Green: "How could I put Cabrini on a bigger map? ... Suddenly I knew—I could move in there."  Prior to her move to Cabrini, Byrne closed down several liquor stores in the area, citing the stores as hangout for gangs and murderers. Byrne also ordered the Chicago Housing Authority to evict tenants who were suspected of harboring gang members in their apartments, which totaled approximately 800 tenants. Byrne moved into a 4th floor apartment in a Cabrini extension building on North Sedgwick Avenue with her husband on March 31 at around 8:30 p.m. after attending a dinner at the Conrad Hilton hotel. Hours after Byrne moved into the housing project, police raided the building and arrested eleven street gang members who they learned through informants were planning to have a shootout in the mayor's building later that evening. Byrne described her first night there as "lovely" and "very quiet". Byrne stayed at the housing project for three weeks to bring attention to the housing project's crime and infrastructure problems. Byrne's stay at Cabrini ended on April 18, 1981, following an Easter celebration at the project which drew protests and demonstrators who claimed Byrne's move to the project was just a publicity stunt.

Finances
One of the crises that Byrne faced in her first year as mayor was a major shortage of funds in both the municipal government and by the Chicago Board of Education (the city's school board). This arose due to questionable past borrowing practices, and necessitated both budget cuts and further borrowing to resolve.

Handgun ordinance
In January 1982, Byrne proposed an ordinance effectively banning new handgun registration, which was considered controversial. The ordinance was created to put a freeze on the number of legally owned handguns in Chicago and to required owners of handguns to reregister them annually. The ordinance was approved by a 6–1 vote in February 1982. The ordinance was struck down by the Supreme Court in the 2010 case McDonald v. City of Chicago.

Hosting of special events
Byrne used special events, such as ChicagoFest, to revitalize Navy Pier and the downtown Chicago Theatre. ChicagoFest had first been held the year previous to her election. One of Byrne's first efforts as mayor had instead been an attempt to cancel future editions of the event. But, after facing complaints from citizens and unions, Byrne allowed the festival to continue as an annual event, and formally renamed it "Mayor Jane M. Byrne's ChicagoFest". Festivals inaugurated during her tenure included Taste of Chicago. Byrne held a number of smaller-scale events in neighborhoods across the city, titling them with the prefix "Mayor Byrne's". As mayor, Byrne was a strong supporter of the planned Chicago 1992 World's Fair. In 1980, Byrne announced that the city would host a Championship Auto Racing Teams "Indy Car" automobile race at Grant Park on the 4th of July weekend of the following year. However, after this faced criticism, Byrne quickly canceled these plans.

Labor
In her first year in office, she faced strikes by labor unions as the city's transit workers, public school teachers and firefighters all went on strike.

Transportation
There had been plans under Daley and Bilandic to demolish the Loop elevated rail and replace it with subway. Byrne appointed a commission that ultimately recommended that the Loop should be retained, with modernization.

In 1981, Byrne disbanded the Chicago Transit Authority's dedicated security force, transferring its duties instead to the Chicago Police Department.

Other matters
In November 1981, the Chicago City Council approved a new redistricting map for the city's aldermanic wards which was drawn by Byrne's administration. The U.S. Court of Appeals would find, in 1984, that the map was in violation of the federal Voting Rights Act of 1965.

On November 11, 1981, Dan Goodwin, who had successfully climbed the Sears Tower the previous spring, battled for his life on the side of the John Hancock Center. William Blair, Chicago's fire commissioner, had ordered the Chicago Fire Department to stop Goodwin by directing a full-power fire hose at him and by using fire axes to break window glass in Goodwin's path. Mayor Byrne rushed to the scene and ordered the fire department to stand down. Then, through a smashed out 38th floor window, she told Goodwin, who was hanging from the building's side a floor below, that though she did not agree with his climbing of the John Hancock Center, she certainly opposed the fire department knocking him to the ground below. Byrne then allowed Goodwin to continue to the top.

Byrne initiated the idea for creating a unified lakefront museum campus, which was implemented subsequent to her tenure as Museum Campus, as well as the idea of renovating Navy Pier, also implemented subsequent to her tenure.

Byrne expanded O'Hare International Airport.

Bid for reelection

In August 1982, Byrne decided that she would seek a second term as mayor. At the beginning of her re-election campaign, she was trailing behind Richard M. Daley, then Cook County State's Attorney, by 3% in a poll done by the Chicago Tribune in July 1982. Unlike the 1979 mayoral election in which Byrne received 59.3% of the African-American vote, Byrne had lost half of that vote.

Byrne was defeated in the 1983 Democratic primary for mayor by Harold Washington; the younger Daley ran a close third. Washington won the Democratic primary with just 36% of the vote; Byrne had 33%. Washington went on to win the general election.

Assessments
A 1993 survey of historians, political scientists and urban experts conducted by Melvin G. Holli of the University of Illinois at Chicago saw Byrne ranked as the tenth-worst American big-city mayor to serve between the years 1820 and 1993. When the survey was limited only to mayors that were in office post-1960, the results saw Byrne ranked the fourth-worst.

Later career
Byrne ran against Washington again in the 1987 Democratic primary, but was narrowly defeated. She endorsed Washington for the general election, in which he defeated two Democrats running under other parties' banners (Edward Vrdolyak and Thomas Hynes) and a Republican.

Early into her 1987 campaign, in October 1985, Byrne called for a feasibility study of the potential to construct a third major airport for the city on the site of the South Works. Soon after, Governor James R. Thompson endorsed the idea of immediately planning for a third major airport to serve Chicago. This would be the one of the impetuses of decades-long discussions and studies for a third major airport for the city, including the proposed Chicago south suburban airport.

Byrne next ran in the 1988 Democratic primary for Cook County Circuit Court Clerk. She faced the Democratic Party's slated candidate, Aurelia Pucinski (who was endorsed by Mayor Washington and is the daughter of then-Alderman Roman Pucinski). Pucinski defeated Byrne in the primary and Vrdolyak, by then a Republican, in the general election. Byrne's fourth run for mayor became a rematch with Daley in the 1991 primary. She received only 5.9 percent of the vote, a distant third behind Daley and Alderman Danny K. Davis.

Personal life
In 1956, she married William P. Byrne, a Marine. The couple had a daughter, Katherine C. Byrne (born 1957). On May 31, 1959, while flying from Marine Corps Air Station Cherry Point to Naval Air Station Glenview in a Skyraider, Lt. Byrne attempted to land in a dense fog. After being waved off for landing twice, his plane's wing struck the porch of a nearby house and the plane crashed into Sunset Memorial Park, killing him. Byrne married journalist Jay McMullen in 1978, and they remained married until his death from lung cancer in 1992. Byrne lived in the same apartment building from the 1970s until her death in 2014. She has one grandchild, Willie. Her daughter, Kathy, is a lawyer with a Chicago firm. Mayor Byrne's book, My Chicago (1992) covers her life through her political career. In 2011, Byrne attended the inauguration of the city's new mayor, Rahm Emanuel.

Death and legacy

Byrne had entered hospice care and died on November 14, 2014, in Chicago, aged 81, from complications of a stroke she suffered in January 2013. She was survived by her daughter Katherine and her grandson Willie. Her funeral Mass was held at St. Vincent de Paul Church on Monday, November 17, 2014. She was buried at Calvary Catholic Cemetery in Evanston, Illinois.

In a dedication ceremony held on August 29, 2014, Governor Pat Quinn renamed the Circle Interchange in Chicago the Jane Byrne Interchange. In July 2014, the Chicago City Council voted to rename the plaza surrounding the historic Chicago Water Tower on North Michigan Avenue the Jane M. Byrne Plaza in her honor.

Electoral history

Mayoral
1979

|- bgcolor="#E9E9E9" align="center"
! colspan="5" rowspan="1" align="center" |1979 Chicago mayoral Democratic primary
|- bgcolor="#E9E9E9" align="center"
! colspan="2" rowspan="1" align="left" | Candidate
! width="75" | Votes
! width="30" | %
|-
| bgcolor="#3333FF" |
| align="left" | Jane Byrne
| 
| 
|-
| bgcolor="#3333FF" |
| align="left" | Michael A. Bilandic (incumbent)
| 
| 
|-
| colspan="2" align="left" | Turnout
|  ||
|-
|}

1983

|- bgcolor="#E9E9E9" align="center"
! colspan="5" rowspan="1" align="center" |1983 Chicago mayoral Democratic primary
|- bgcolor="#E9E9E9" align="center"
! colspan="2" rowspan="1" align="left" | Candidate
! width="75" | Votes
! width="30" | %
|-
| bgcolor="#3333FF" |
| align="left" | Harold Washington
| 
| 
|-
| bgcolor="#3333FF" |
| align="left" | Jane Byrne (incumbent)
| 
| 
|-
| bgcolor="#3333FF" |
| align="left" | Richard M. Daley
| 
| 
|-
| bgcolor="#3333FF" |
| align="left" | Frank R. Ranallo
| 
| 
|-
| bgcolor="#3333FF" |
| align="left" | William Markowski
| 
| 
|-
| bgcolor="#3333FF" |
| align="left" | Sheila Jones
| 
| 
|-
| colspan="2" align="left" | Turnout
|  ||
|-
|}

1987

|- bgcolor="#E9E9E9" align="center"
! colspan="5" rowspan="1" align="center" |1987 Chicago mayoral Democratic primary
|- bgcolor="#E9E9E9" align="center"
! colspan="2" rowspan="1" align="left" | Candidate
! width="75" | Votes
! width="30" | %
|-
| bgcolor="#3333FF" |
| align="left" | Harold Washington (incumbent)
| 
| 
|-
| bgcolor="#3333FF" |
| align="left" | Jane Byrne
| 
| 
|-
| bgcolor="#3333FF" |
| align="left" | Sheila Jones
| 
| 
|-
| colspan="2" align="left" | Turnout
|  || 
|-
|}

1991

Clerk of the Circuit Court of Cook County

References

Further reading

External links
Former City Hall Reporter Ray Hanania's online look at the City Hall Press Room and the Byrne Administration, published in the Chicago Reader and later online, themediaoasis.com. Retrieved November 16, 2014.

 
 

1933 births
2014 deaths
Barat College alumni
Burials at Calvary Cemetery (Evanston, Illinois)
Catholics from Illinois
DePaul University alumni
Illinois Democrats
Mayors of Chicago
Women mayors of places in Illinois
Writers from Chicago
21st-century American women